The 1970 United States Senate election in Tennessee was held on November 3, 1970. Republican Bill Brock defeated Democratic incumbent Albert Gore, Sr. who ran for a fourth term. With Brock's victory, Republicans held both of Tennessee's U.S. Senate seats for the first time since Reconstruction.

Major candidates

Democratic
Albert Gore, Sr., Incumbent U.S. Senator since 1953

Republican
Bill Brock, U.S. Representative
Tex Ritter, country singer
J. Durelle Boles

Results

References

Tennessee
1970
1970 Tennessee elections